Funkhouser is an unincorporated community in Effingham County, Illinois, United States. It is part of the Effingham, IL Micropolitan Statistical Area.

Notes

Unincorporated communities in Effingham County, Illinois
Unincorporated communities in Illinois